Nair Ibrahim Meer Abdulrahman (born 16 July 1967) is a retired UAE football player who played as a left back for the UAE national football team and Sharjah FC. He played in the 1990 FIFA World Cup along with his twin brother Eissa.

References

External links
 
 

1967 births
Living people
Emirati footballers
1988 AFC Asian Cup players
1990 FIFA World Cup players
1992 AFC Asian Cup players
Sharjah FC players
Emirati twins
Twin sportspeople
United Arab Emirates international footballers
UAE Pro League players
Association football defenders